The Englund Gambit is a rarely played chess opening that starts with the moves:
1. d4 e5
The gambit is considered weak; Boris Avrukh writes that 1...e5 "seems to me the worst possible reply to White's first move". It is almost never seen in top-level play, although Paul Keres once tried it. The gambit is occasionally seen in amateur games and in correspondence chess, and the 3...Qe7 version of the gambit was frequently used by Henri Grob.

Black has numerous ways to continue after 1.d4 e5 2.dxe5. After the continuation 2...Nc6 3.Nf3, Black may round up the e5-pawn with 3...Qe7, intending to meet 4.Bf4 with the disruptive 4...Qb4+, and ensuring that White's only way to maintain the extra pawn is to expose the queen with 4.Qd5, but in subsequent play the queen can prove to be awkwardly placed on e7.  3...Nge7 intending 4...Ng6 is another way to round up the e5-pawn, but requires two tempi, while Black can also offer to exchange the f-pawn with 3...f6, or 3...Bc5 intending a subsequent ...f6, with similar play to the Blackmar–Diemer Gambit except that Black has one tempo less.

The gambit can be considered an inferior relative of the Budapest Gambit and Albin Countergambit, as by comparison with those gambits, White has not weakened the b4-square with c2–c4, and may be able to put that tempo to better use in order to avoid giving away any key squares. Accordingly, with careful play White should be able to obtain a greater advantage against the Englund than against the Budapest and Albin, against all approaches by Black.  However, since the Budapest and Albin rely upon White continuing with 2.c4, and can thus be avoided by continuations such as 2.Nf3 (when 2...e5 can be met by 3.Nxe5 in either case), it is easier for exponents of the Englund  Gambit to get their opening on the board and avoid getting into a typical queen's pawn type of game.

History 
1.d4 e5 is also known as the Charlick Gambit after Henry Charlick (1845–1916), the second Australian chess champion, who introduced the 2...d6 line in the early 1890s. The main line Englund Gambit (2...Nc6, 3...Qe7) was introduced by Kārlis Bētiņš (1867–1943), who also established the Latvian Gambit. The Swedish player Fritz Englund (1871–1933) sponsored a thematic tournament in which all games had to begin with the position after 4.Qd5; the 1.d4 e5 gambit complex was later named after him.

Main variations

Main line 

Most common today is 2.dxe5 Nc6 3.Nf3 Qe7 4.Bf4 Qb4+ 5.Bd2 Qxb2 6.Nc3 Bb4 7.Rb1 Qa3. White can try to keep the extra pawn with 4.Qd5, the Stockholm Variation. Black can try a queenside fianchetto with 4...b6, or attempt to regain the pawn with 4...h6, but neither of those lines provide enough compensation for the pawn. Thus, Black usually challenges the e5-pawn immediately with 4...f6, when play continues 5.exf6 Nxf6 6.Qb3. Black does not get enough compensation with the delayed queenside fianchetto 6...b6, so the main line continues 6...d5. After 6...d5, 7.Nc3 Bd7!, threatening 8...Na5, leading to complications and good play for Black (e.g. 8.Bg5 Na5 or 8.Qxb7 Rb8 9.Qxc7 Qc5). After the stronger responses 7.Bf4 and 7.Bg5 (intending 7...Bd7 8.e3), however, while Black retains some compensation for the pawn, White keeps an edge.

Instead, White often allows Black to regain the pawn at the cost of lagging development. The main line runs 4.Bf4 Qb4+ 5.Bd2 (5.Nc3!? is perfectly playable, as 5...Qxf4 is well met by 6.Nd5!, while 5...Qxb2 6.Bd2 transposes to the main line) 5...Qxb2 6.Nc3! White must avoid the notorious trap 6.Bc3 Bb4!, which wins for Black after 7.Bxb4 Nxb4 or 7.Qd2 Bxc3 8.Qxc3 Qc1#.

After 6.Nc3, 6...Nb4? is refuted by 7.Nd4 c6 8.a4. The main line instead continues 6...Bb4 7.Rb1 Qa3 8.Rb3 Qa5 9.e4 Nge7 or 9.a3 Bxc3 10.Bxc3 Qc5, when White has some advantage due to the lead in development, but Black is not without chances due to the loose white pieces and shattered white pawn structure. However, in 2006 Bücker pointed out that 8.Nd5!, previously analysed by Grob as leading only to an unclear position, has been improved for White, and Black has yet to find a good response. Avrukh also considers this very strong, analyzing 8...Bxd2+ 9.Qxd2 Qxa2 10.Rd1 Kd8 11.Ng5 Nh6 12.e6! d6 (12...Qa5? 13.e7+! Ke8 14.Qxa5 Nxa5 15.Nxc7+ wins) 13.exf7 Rf8 14.Nxc7 Kxc7 15.Qxd6+ Kb6 16.Ne4! Qxc2 (or 16...Bf5 17.Nc3 Qxc2 18.Nd5+) 17.Nd2 Rxf7 18.Rb1+ Qxb1+ 19.Nxb1 with "a decisive advantage".  Stefan Bücker offers 13...Qa5 for Black but concludes that White is clearly better after 14.c3 Rf8 15.Nxh7 Rxf7 16.Ng5 Rf8 17.g3 Ne5 18.Bg2 Nhf7 19.Nxf7+ Rxf7 20.Qd4. Avrukh also considers 8...Ba5 9.Rb5 Bxd2+ (9...a6? 10.Rxa5 Nxa5 11.Nxc7+) 10.Qxd2 Kd8 11.Ng5 (the traditional reply 11.e4 may allow Black a playable game after 11...a6!? according to Bücker) 11...Nh6 12.f4!? a6 13.Rb3 Qxa2 14.Nc3 Qa1+ 15.Rb1 Qa5 16.e3 when Black is "close to losing", for example 16...Re8 17.Bc4 Nxe5 18.fxe5 Qxe5 19.Bxf7! Qxg5 20.Bxe8 Kxe8 21.Nd5 Qe5 22.0-0 and "White wins."  Bücker also considers 9.e4!? to be a strong alternative to 9.Rb5, leading to a clear advantage for White.  Black therefore sometimes tries 4...d6 instead, continuing 5.exd6 Qf6 6.Qc1 (or 6.e3, returning the pawn).

White's other major try for advantage is 4.Nc3 Nxe5 5.e4, securing a lead in development and leaving Black's queen awkwardly placed on e7. Stefan Bücker recommends 5...Nf6 6.Bg5 c6 7.Nxe5 Qxe5 8.f4 Qe6, with a playable game but some advantage for White.

Blackburne–Hartlaub Gambit 

The Blackburne–Hartlaub Gambit, 2...d6, was Charlick's original idea to avoid the closed openings, aiming for compensation for a pawn after 3.exd6 Bxd6. A sample continuation is 4.Nf3 Nf6 5.Bg5 h6 6.Bh4, when White remains a pawn up with some advantage.  White can also delay the immediate 3.exd6, playing 3.Nf3 first, when after 3...Bg4, 4.e4 Nd7 transposes into a gambit line of the Philidor Defence played by Blackburne.  Black gets partial compensation for the pawn after 5.exd6 Bxd6 6.Be2 Ngf6 7.Nc3 Qe7.  White obtains a large advantage, however, after 2...d6 3.Nf3 Bg4 4.Bg5 Qd7 5.exd6 Bxd6 6.Nbd2.

Soller Gambit 

The Soller Gambit, 2...Nc6 3.Nf3 f6, was named after Karl Soller.  The immediate 2...f6 is sometimes seen as well, when 3.Nf3 Nc6 transposes, but 3.e4! Nc6 4.Bc4 gives White a large advantage.  In the Soller Gambit proper, International Master Gary Lane recommends 4.exf6 Nxf6 5.Bg5. In this line Black gets partial compensation via 5...h6!, e.g. 6.Bh4 Bc5 (or 6...g5 at once) 7.e3 g5 or 6.Bxf6 Qxf6 7.c3 Bc5, although White keeps some advantage. 
   
White can also return the pawn via 4.e4, securing the better chances.  Then after 4...fxe5 5.Bc4, 5...Nf6 6.Ng5! leads to complications that are very good for White, but 5...d6 may be an improvement.

Felbecker Gambit 

The Felbecker Gambit, 3...Bc5, usually followed by ...f6, is a variant on the Soller Gambit approach, when again Black may get partial compensation in such lines as 4.Nc3 f6 5.exf6 Nxf6 6.Bg5 d6 7.e3 h6, but 4.e4 is also critical, when Black's best is 4...Qe7 as 4...f6 5.Bc4! gives White a large advantage.

Zilbermints Gambit 
The Zilbermints Gambit, 2...Nc6 3.Nf3 Nge7, was named after  the American chess player Lev D. Zilbermints who had extensive analysis published on the line in Blackmar Diemer Gambit World issues 61–63. German FIDE Master Stefan Bücker provided further analysis in Kaissiber 5 and 6.  The idea is to play ...Ng6 and win the pawn back.

Gary Lane recommends the response 4.Bf4.  After 4...Ng6 5.Bg3, Zilbermints recommends either 5...Bc5 or 5...Qe7 6.Nc3 Qb4, when White's main responses are 7.Rb1, 7.Qd2 and 7.a3.  After 7.Rb1, a possible continuation is 7...Qa5 8.Qd5 Bb4 9.Qxa5 Bxa5 10.e3 0-0 11.Bd3 Re8 12.Bxg6 Bxc3+ 13.bxc3 fxg6, when Black's superior pawn structure compensates for the lost pawn, while both 7.Qd2 and 7.a3 lead to considerable complications.  An alternative for White is 5.e3, but Black may get some compensation for the pawn after 5...d6.  If 4.Bg5, then Black obtains a good game via 4...h6 5.Bh4 g5 6.Bg3 Nf5.

Thus 4.Nc3 is the most critical response, when 4...Ng6 is ineffective in view of 5.Bg5! Be7 6.Bxe7 Qxe7 7.Nd5, so Black may need to fall back upon 4...h6.

Alternatives for White 
White can decline the Englund Gambit in a number of ways, including 2.e4 (transposing to the Centre Game) or 2.c3 (transposing to the Saragossa Opening).  2.d5 is sometimes seen, but leaves Black with a good game after 2...Bc5, while 2.e3 can be met by 2...exd4 3.exd4 d5 transposing to the Exchange Variation of the French Defence, and in addition Black can avoid 3...d5 and simply develop with a good game.  2...Nc6 and 2...e4 may also be playable. After 2.Nf3, Black gets a good game with 2...exd4 3.Nxd4 d5, preparing ...c5, and 2...e4 3.Ne5 d6 4.Nc4 d5 is also good for Black.

After 2.dxe5 Nc6, instead of 3.Nf3, White can also defend the e5-pawn with 3.Bf4, when Bücker suggests either 3...g5 followed by 4...Bg7, or 3...f6 hoping to get an improved version of the Soller Gambit. 3.f4 is sometimes seen, but Black has reasonable chances after 3...f6 or 3...d6.  White can also transpose to a line of the Nimzowitsch Defence with 3.e4.

1.d4 e5 2.c4 d6 is one possible move order to reach the English Rat.

See also 
 List of chess openings
 List of chess openings named after people

References 

Bibliography

External links 

 Gary Lane on the Soller Gambit (page 8)
 
 

Chess openings